Forrest Halsey (November 9, 1877 – September 30, 1949), born William Forrest Halsey, was an American writer and screenwriter.

Halsey's novels included Fate and the Butterfly (1909), The Bawlerout (1912), and The Shadow on the Hearth (1914). From 1907 to 1918, he published more than one hundred short stories in popular magazines including Young's Magazine, The Argosy, The Cavalier, and Munsey's Magazine.

As a screenwriter, he wrote for more than 60 films between 1913 and 1942. He was born in Roseville, Newark, New Jersey, and died in Los Angeles County, California.

Selected filmography
 Ashes of Embers (1916)
 A Broadway Saint (1919)
 The Green Goddess (1923)
 Monsieur Beaucaire (1924)
 A Sainted Devil (1924)
 Twenty Dollars a Week (1924)
 Camille of the Barbary Coast (1925)
 Stage Struck (1925)
 Sally of the Sawdust (1925)
 The Palm Beach Girl (1926)
 The Sorrows of Satan (1926)
 Broadway Nights (1927)
 The Whip Woman (1928)
 Her Private Life (1929)
 The Divine Lady (1929)
 Kept Husbands (1931)
 The Lady Who Dared (1931)
 Silver Queen (1942)

References

External links

1877 births
1949 deaths
American male screenwriters
Writers from Newark, New Jersey
Screenwriters from New Jersey
20th-century American male writers
20th-century American screenwriters